Cəfərxan (also, Dzhafarkhan) is a village in the Saatly Rayon of Azerbaijan.

Population
It has a population of 375. 

It is the least populous municipality in the region.

References 

Populated places in Saatly District